The Jersey Half Marathon (currently known as the "Run Jersey Half Marathon") is an annual half marathon staged in the north west of Jersey, Channel Islands.

History
The event was organised by the Jersey Hash House Harriers from 1989, until 2011. Run Jersey took over organising the event from 2012.

The course
The course is set over the parishes of St. John, St. Lawrence, St. Mary, and St. Ouen.

Results

2022

2021

2012
Men
 2012 — Mavny Thomas → 1:15:24

Women
 2012 — Jo Gorrod → 1:22:59

See also
Jersey Marathon
JSAC Half Marathon

References

External links
 

Sport in Jersey
Recurring sporting events established in 1989
Half marathons
1989 establishments in Jersey
Spring (season) events in Jersey